The Apostolic Nunciature to Côte d'Ivoire is an ecclesiastical office of the Catholic Church in Côte d'Ivoire. It is a diplomatic post of the Holy See, whose representative is called the Apostolic Nuncio with the rank of an ambassador.

Representatives of the Holy See to Côte d'Ivoire
Apostolic Pro-Nuncios
Giovanni Mariani (19 June 1972 - 11 January 1975)
Bruno Wüstenberg (19 December 1973 - 17 January 1979)
Apostolic Nuncios 
Justo Mullor García (22 March 1979 - 3 May 1985)
Antonio Mattiazzo (16 November 1985 - 5 July 1989)
Janusz Bolonek (25 September 1989 - 23 January 1995)
Luigi Ventura (25 March 1995 - 25 March 1999)
Mario Zenari (12 July 1999 - 10 May 2004)
Mario Roberto Cassari (31 July 2004 - 14 February 2008)
Ambrose Madtha (8 May 2008 – 8 December 2012)
Joseph Spiteri (1 October 2013 - 7 March 2018)
Ante Jozić was appointed on 2 February 2019, but injuries sustained in a car accident delayed his episcopal consecration and he did not take up the post.
Paolo Borgia (28 October 2019  – 24 September 2022)

See also
Holy See–Ivory Coast relations
Foreign relations of the Holy See
List of diplomatic missions of the Holy See

Notes

References

Ivory Coast
 
Holy See–Ivory Coast relations
Lists of ambassadors to Ivory Coast
Vatican City